Shraddha Musale (born 7 January 1984) is an  Indian model and actress most popular for her role as Dr. Tarika in the detective series C.I.D.. She has gained immense popularity through this role. However, she has done many shows across various GECs. She began her journey with Miss India contest.

Musale starred in the 2009 Hindi film All the Best: Fun Begins as Betty and has also portrayed as CJ in the popular show Miley Jab Hum Tum. In 2016, she appeared in an episodic role of Khidki. Her role as CJ from Mile Jab Hum Tum got her great popularity, she is known as CJ even today. She was last seen in CID in episode no. 1539 which was aired on 29 September 2018.

Filmography

Films

Television

Personal life 
She married Deepak Tomar, a businessman from Lucknow on 29 November 2012.

References

External links
 

Living people
21st-century Indian actresses
Indian film actresses
Indian television actresses
Indian soap opera actresses
Actresses from Ahmedabad
Actresses in Hindi television
1984 births